Martinas Orlando Rankin (born October 20, 1994) is American football offensive tackle who is a free agent. He played college football at Mississippi State and was drafted by the Houston Texans in the third round of the 2018 NFL Draft. He has also been a member of the Kansas City Chiefs.

Early life
After playing at Mendenhall High School in Mississippi, Rankin spent two years at Mississippi Gulf Coast Community College in Perkinston, Mississippi. He was rated as the ninth best junior college recruit by 247 Sports and committed to play at Mississippi State over offers from Oklahoma, Florida, Louisville, Missouri, Ohio State, Ole Miss, Texas, and others.

College career
Rankin redshirted in 2015 and earned a starting job as a junior in 2016. He had a breakout year in 2017, winning the Kent Hull Trophy and being named to the 2017 All-SEC football team.

Professional career

NFL Draft
Before his senior season, Rankin was projected as a first round pick in the 2018 NFL Draft by several writers. Rankin's draft stock began to slide after he sustained an ankle injury during the season and also had mediocre performances against LSU and Auburn. On November 16, 2017, it was announced that Rankin had accepted his invitation to play in the 2018 Senior Bowl. On January 20, 2018, it was reported that Rankin would be unable to play in the Senior Bowl due to an ankle injury he sustained in the TaxSlayer Bowl. Rankin attended the NFL Scouting Combine in Indianapolis, but did not perform any drills due to the foot injury he sustained. On March 28, 2018, he attended Mississippi State's pro day, but chose to only perform the broad jump and vertical jump. Rankin also attended a private meetings with representatives from the Cincinnati Bengals and Denver Broncos. At the conclusion of the pre-draft process, Rankin was projected to be a second or third round pick by NFL draft experts and scouts. He was ranked as the fourth best offensive tackle by Scouts Inc. and was ranked the seventh best offensive tackle in the draft by DraftScout.com and Sports Illustrated.

Houston Texans
The Houston Texas selected Rankins in the third round with the 80th overall pick in the 2018 NFL Draft. Rankins was the eighth offensive tackle drafted in 2018. The pick used to draft Rankin was acquired in a trade that sent Duane Brown to the Seattle Seahawks.

On May 10, 2018, the Houston Texans signed Rankin to a four-year, $3.54 million contract that includes a signing bonus of $901,268.

The Texans stated they drafted Rankin to play offensive tackle although many scouts and draft experts viewed him as an interior offensive lineman in the NFL. During rookie minicamp, Rankin sustained a foot injury which required surgery and was sidelined for the entire training camp.

Kansas City Chiefs
On August 31, 2019, Rankin was traded to the Kansas City Chiefs in exchange for running back Carlos Hyde. He started five games at left guard before suffering a knee injury in Week 10. He was placed on injured reserve on November 11, 2019. During his absence, the Chiefs went on to win Super Bowl LIV, their first championship in 50 years. He was placed on the active/physically unable to perform list (PUP) at the start of training camp on July 31, 2020. He was moved to the reserve/PUP list at the start of the regular season on September 5, 2020. He was activated on November 10. He was placed on the reserve/COVID-19 list by the Chiefs on November 16, 2020, and activated on November 23. He was waived on June 17, 2021.

References

External links

Kansas City Chiefs bio
Mississippi State Bulldogs bio

1994 births
Living people
People from Mendenhall, Mississippi
Players of American football from Mississippi
American football offensive tackles
Mississippi State Bulldogs football players
Houston Texans players
Kansas City Chiefs players